The 2015 Mid-American Conference football season is the 70th season of college football play for the Mid-American Conference (MAC) and is part of the 2015 NCAA Division I FBS football season

2015 MAC Specialty Award Winners
Coach of the Year:  Matt Campbell, Toledo
Freshman of the Year:  RB Jamauri Bogan, Western Michigan
Offensive Player of the Year:  QB Matt Johnson, Bowling Green
Defensive Player of the Year:  LB Jatavis Brown, Akron
Special Teams Player of the Year: KR Aregeros Turner, Northern Illinois
Vern Smith Leadership Award Winner:  QB Matt Johnson, Bowling Green

All Conference Teams
2015 All-MAC First Team Offense
Quarterback – Matt Johnson, Bowling Green
Offensive Linemen – Storm Norton, Toledo
Offensive Linemen – Andrew Ness, Northern Illinois
Offensive Lineman – Willie Beavers, Western Michigan
Offensive Linemen – Nick Beamish, Central Michigan
Offensive Linemen – Aidan Conlon, Northern Illinois
Tight End – Matt Weiser, Buffalo
Wide Receiver – Roger Lewis, Bowling Green
Wide Receiver – Corey Davis, Western Michigan
Wide Receiver – Tajae Sharpe, UMass
Wide Receiver – Daniel Braverman, Western Michigan
Running Back – Joel Bouagnon, Northern Illinois
Running Back – Travis Greene, Bowling Green
Placekicker – Christian Hagan, Northern Illinois

2015 All-MAC First Team Defense
Outside Linebacker – Jatavis Brown, Akron
Outside Linebacker – Sean Wiggins, Ball State
Inside Linebacker – Boomer Mays, Northern Illinois
Inside Linebacker – Austin Valdez, Bowling Green
Down Lineman – Orion Jones, Toledo
Down Lineman – Perez Ford, Northern Illinois
Down Lineman – Joshua Posley, Ball State
Down Lineman – Terence Waugh, Kent State
Defensive Back – Shawun Lurry, Northern Illinois
Defensive Back – Nate Holley, Kent State
Defensive Back – Cheatham Norrils, Toledo
Defensive Back – Demetrius Monday, Kent State
Punter – Joe Davidson, Bowling Green
 
2015 All-MAC First Team Specialists
Kickoff Return Specialist – Aregeros Turner, Northern Illinois
Punt Return Specialist – Corey Jones, Toledo

2015 All-MAC Second Team Offense
Quarterback – Cooper Rush, Central Michigan
Offensive Lineman – Alex Huettel, Bowling Green
Offensive Lineman – Jacob Richard, Ball State
Offensive Lineman – Levon Myers, Northern Illinois
Offensive Lineman – Jacob Bennett, Bowling Green
Offensive Lineman – John Kling, Buffalo
Tight End – Ben McCord, Central Michigan
Wide Receiver – Jordan Williams, Ball State
Wide Receiver – Kenny Golladay, Northern Illinois
Wide Receiver – Gehrig Dieter, Bowling Green
Wide Receiver – Alonzo Russell, Toledo
Running Back – Kareem Hunt, Toledo
Running Back – Terry Swanson, Toledo
Placekicker – Brian Eavey, Central Michigan
 
2015 All-MAC Second Team Defense
Outside Linebacker – Trent Greene, Bowling Green
Outside Linebacker – Brandon Berry, Buffalo
Inside Linebacker – Great Ibe, Eastern Michigan
Inside Linebacker – Jovan Santos-Knox, UMass
Down Lineman – Allen Covington, Toledo
Down Lineman – Blake Serpa, Central Michigan
Down Lineman – Bryson Albright, Miami
Down Lineman – Cody Grice, Akron
Defensive Back – Darius Phillips, Western Michigan
Defensive Back – Kavon Frazier, Central Michigan
Defensive Back – Ian Wells, Ohio
Defensive Back – Ronald Zamort, Western Michigan
Punter – Anthony Melchiori, Kent State
 
2015 All-MAC Second Team Specialists
Kickoff Return Specialist – Darius Phillips, Western Michigan
Punt Return Specialist – Trey Dudley-Giles, UMass

2015 All-MAC Third Team Offense
Quarterback – Zach Terrell, Western Michigan
Offensive Lineman – Taylor Moton, Western Michigan
Offensive Lineman – Ramadan Ahmeti, Central Michigan
Offensive Lineman – Mike McQueen, Ohio
Offensive Lineman – Lucas Powell, Ohio
Offensive Lineman – Isaiah Williams, Akron
Tight End – Rodney Mills, UMass
Wide Receiver – Jesse Kroll, Central Michigan
Wide Receiver – Ronnie Moore, Bowling Green
Wide Receiver – Sebastian Smith, Ohio
Wide Receiver – KeVonn Mabon, Ball State
Running Back – Jamauri Bogan, Western Michigan
Running Back – Darius Jackson, Eastern Michigan
Placekicker – Andrew Haldeman, Western Michigan
 
2015 All-MAC Third Team Defense
Outside Linebacker – Okezie Alozie, Buffalo
Outside Linebacker – Trey Seals, UMass
Inside Linebacker – Matt Dellinger, Kent State
Inside Linebacker – Quentin Poling, Ohio
Down Lineman – Jamal Marcus, Akron
Down Lineman – Rodney Coe, Akron
Down Lineman – JT Jones, Miami
Down Lineman – Trent Voss, Toledo
Defensive Back – Asantay Brown, Western Michigan
Defensive Back – Marlon Moore, Northern Illinois
Defensive Back – Boise Ross, Buffalo
Defensive Back – DeJuan Rogers, Toledo
Punter – Logan Laurent, UMass
 
2015 All-MAC Third Team Specialists
Kickoff Return Specialist – KeVonn Mabon, Ball State
Punt Return Specialist – Ryan Burbrink, Bowling Green

Bowl games
Seven MAC programs received invitations to bowl games for the 2015 season. This matches the MAC's record number of bowl invitations in a single season, a record which was established in the 2012 bowl season.

NOTE: All times are local

References